Swan View is an eastern suburb of Perth, Western Australia. Its local government areas are the City of Swan and the Shire of Mundaring.

The Brown Park community recreation ground is the location of the long-standing annual Swan View Agricultural Show.

Transport
The railway station of Swan View was the important control point for traffic through and around the Swan View Tunnel until it closed on 13 February 1966.

Today, Swan View is served by Transperth buses from Midland, operated by the Public Transport Authority, while the Avonlink/Prospector railway line to Northam and beyond runs along Swan View's western edge.

Geography
Swan View is bounded by the Avonlink/Prospector railway line to the west, the former railway (now part of the Railway Reserves Heritage Trail) to the south, John Forrest National Park to the east, and a line east from Blackadder Creek (in part incorporating O'Connor Road and Murchison Drive) to the north. The suburb is almost entirely residential and parkland.

At the 2011 census, Swan View had a population of 8,027 people living in 3,349 dwellings. About 15% of the population are of Southern or Eastern European origins.

Notes

References

External links
  Swan View Community Association
 Mundaring and Hills Historical Society website
 Swan View on Geoscience Australia

 
Suburbs and localities in the City of Swan
Suburbs and localities in the Shire of Mundaring